Michael Haydn's Symphony No. 36 in B-flat major, Perger 28, Sherman 36, MH 475, written in Salzburg in 1788, is the last B-flat major symphony he wrote, the third of his final set of six symphonies.

Scored for 2 oboes, 2 bassoons, 2 horns, 2 trumpets, timpani and strings. It is perhaps the first symphony in B-flat major to use trumpets and drums, something which is thought to have been pioneered by Joseph Haydn (see Symphony No. 98). This symphony is in three movements:

Allegro con fuoco
Andante con espressione, in F major
Rondo. Presto molto

The first movement, in sonata form, has for its first theme one of Haydn's most triadic themes, with the first violins not playing a note outside of the tonic chord until bar 13.

The second theme (starting at bar 40) is by contrast extremely scalar, moving primarily in seconds. The development uses a new theme to lead back to the recapitulation.

Unlike Haydn's other slow movements in symphonies with trumpets and timpani, the timpani are not silent in this one (see Joseph Haydn's Symphony No. 88). Bassoons and oboes take turns doubling the first violins on the melody.

The melody is for the most part entrusted to the first violins, but the first bassoon often doubles it an octave below (while the second bassoon sticks to the usual duty of doubling the cello line in unison).

The third movement, a rondo, features dramatic contrasts of piano and forte in its main theme.

Discography

Like the other symphonies of the 1788 set of six, this one is in the CPO disc with Johannes Goritzki conducting the New German Chamber Academy.

References
 A. Delarte, "A Quick Overview Of The Instrumental Music Of Michael Haydn" Bob's Poetry Magazine November 2006: 29 - 30 PDF
 Charles H. Sherman and T. Donley Thomas, Johann Michael Haydn (1737 - 1806), a chronological thematic catalogue of his works. Stuyvesant, New York: Pendragon Press (1993)
 C. Sherman, "Johann Michael Haydn" in The Symphony: Salzburg, Part 2 London: Garland Publishing (1982): lxviii

Symphony 36
Compositions in B-flat major
1788 compositions